Instrumental Directions is the third album by Louisville, Kentucky group The Nite-Liters, the instrumental ensemble offshoot of New Birth, featuring Tony Churchill, James Baker, Robin Russell, Austin Lander, Robert "Lurch" Jackson, Leroy Taylor, Charlie Hearndon, Bruce Marshall, and Nathaniel "Nebs" Neblett. 

The album was released in 1972 on RCA Records and produced by mentor Harvey Fuqua.

Track listing
"Theme from Shaft" (Isaac Hayes) -  	 4:16   	
"Brand X" (James Baker) -	4:43 	
"Them (Changes)" (Buddy Miles) -	4:45 	
"Respect to the Other Man" (Johnny Baylor, Johnny Northern, Luther Ingram, Randall Stewart) -	5:00 	
"Cherish Every Precious Moment" (Vernon Bullock) -	3:00 	
"Afro-Strut" (Harvey Fuqua, Charles Hearndon) -	2:50 	
Medley: "McArthur Park, What's Going On, Fuqua's Theme" (Jimmy Webb/Marvin Gaye, Al Cleveland, Renaldo Benson/Harvey Fuqua) -	4:55 	
"I've Got Dreams to Remember" (Joe Rock, Otis Redding, Zelma Redding) - 	3:15 	
"Wichita Lineman" (Jimmy Webb) - 	5:05 	
"Bakers Instant" (James Baker) -	3:39

Charts

References

External links
 The Nite-Liters-Instrumental Directions at Discogs

1972 albums
The Nite-Liters albums
RCA Records albums
Albums produced by Harvey Fuqua